, also known as Shin Chan, Me and the Space Princess, is a 2012 Japanese anime film.
The film celebrates the 20th anniversary of Crayon Shin-chan anime. It is the 20th film based on the popular comedy manga and anime series Crayon Shin-chan. This movie was also released in India on Hungama TV on 22 March 2014 as Shin Chan The Movie Himawari Banegi Rajkumari (Himawari will Became a Princess). It was Keiji Fujiwara’s first of 2 films in 2012, the other was Tokumei Sentai Go-Busters the Movie: Protect the Tokyo Enetower!.

The name of the theme song is: 'Shounen yo, uso wo tsuke!" (Boy, you'll lie).

Story
Shinnosuke Nohara, and his sister Himawari, have a fight over a plate of custard. Suddenly, two mysterious men appear in green clothing and hats bearing sunflower emblems (Himawari means "sunflower" in Japanese). They refer to Shin-chan's sister as a princess, and pass a paper to Shin-chan who signs it without hesitating which actually had that he would give Himawari to their planet as a princess.  The Nohara family is promptly abducted to a UFO in a scene that draws some visual concepts from the "Phantom Zone" jail, used in the Superman motion picture series.

The Nohara family (father, mother, brother, sister, and their dog) all travel aboard the UFO to the "Himawari planet" on a mysterious and important mission that affects Earth, and may decide the fate of peace across the entire universe.

Characters
Sunday Goronesuki: Great stars and sunflower. Gorone and love to dance.
Uranasubin: Minister of stars and sunflower inadvertently. Came to Earth looking for a sunflower.
Getz: In charge of the earth. Have a bachelor on the planet.
Reasonable-Ikemen: Minister of sunflower Twink star. The selection of Twink has a severe eye.
Boinda de Yodesu: Minister of sleep star sunflower us. Has been that the baby sleep in a number of breast.
Queue or not ー: Minister of stars and sunflower snacks. Chuck out the junk from the star guy.
Shrill-Keronpa: Minister of sunflower stars and talking. Hot news to announce to everyone.
Mokkun: Minister of sunflower star carries us. Bringing you everything.

Cast
Shinnosuke Nohara: Akiko Yajima
Misae Nohara: Miki Narahashi
Hiroshi Nohara: Keiji Fujiwara
Himawari Nohara: Satomi Kōrogi
Toru Kazama / Shiro: Mari Mashiba
Nene Sakurada: Tamao Hayashi
Masao Sato: Teiyū Ichiryūsai
Bo-chan: Chie Satō
Principal: Rokurō Naya
Miss Yoshinaga: Halevi Terada
Miss Matsuzaka: Michie Tomizawa
Teacher Ageo: Kotono Mitsuishi
Mitch Motoko: Makoto Ohmoto
Yoshirin: Daisuke Sakaguchi

References

External links

2012 anime films
Fierceness That Invites Storm! Me and the Space Princess
Animated films about extraterrestrial life